Aivi Belinda Kerstin Luik (born 18 March 1985) is an Australian soccer player who plays as a midfielder for Swedish club BK Häcken FF. She represented the Australia women's national team, making over 30 appearances.

She previously played for Brisbane Roar and Perth Glory in the W-League, Brøndby IF in Denmark's Elitedivisionen, Fylkir in Iceland's Úrvalsdeild kvenna, Notts County F.C. in England's FA WSL, Vålerenga in Norway and for Spanish Primera División club Sevilla FC.

Early life and collegiate career
Born in Australia to Estonian and Swedish parents, Luik attended Brescia University in Kentucky before transferring to the University of Nevada, Reno where she was a two-year starter for the Nevada Wolf Pack from 2005 to 2006. During her senior year, she captained the squad and scored the game-winning penalty kick to win the Western Athletic Conference (WAC) and lift the NCAA College Cup for the first time.

Luik ended her collegiate career at Nevada having made 41 starts in 42 games. She scored nine goals, served seven assists for 25 points. , she ranked second in the history of the team for game-winning goals and seventh for goals scored. She earned All-WAC second team honors in 2005 and was named Nevada's most valuable player in 2006.

Luik played for FC Indiana and Ottawa Fury in the USL W-League.

Club career

Brisbane Roar, 2009–2011
In 2009, Luik joined Brisbane Roar in the Australian W-League. During the 2009 season, she started in all eleven games for Brisbane. Brisbane finished in third place and advanced to the semi-finals where they defeated Central Coast Mariners 1–0. Brisbane lost the 2009 W-League Grand Final to Sydney FC.

Brøndby IF, 2011–12 
Luik moved to Europe where she played for Brøndby IF in Denmark's Elitedivisionen during the 2011–12 season. Brøndby finished in first place with a  record.

Melbourne City FC, 2015–present 

In 2015, Luik joined Melbourne City FC for their inaugural season in the W-League. During a match against the Melbourne Victory, she converted a free-kick to score the game-winning goal. City won all 12 of its regular season games and finished in first place during the regular season with Luik starting in the midfielder in all games. After advancing to the semi-finals, Melbourne City won the 2016 W-League Grand Final. She was named W-League Player of the Year by the club.

After re-signing with Melbourne City for the 2016–17 season, Luik started in the midfield in 13 of the 14 matches she played, including the semifinal and Grand Final. Melbourne finished in fourth place during the regular season with a  record and advanced to the semi-finals. After defeating Brisbane Roar in penalty kicks, Melbourne City advanced and won the 2017 W-League Grand Final for the second consecutive year.

Notts County, 2016 
In March 2016, Luik signed with English side Notts County F.C. on a two-year deal. During the 2016 FA WSL season, she made 14 appearances including 9 starts. Notts County finished in  sixth place with a  record.

Pomigliano
In August 2021 Luik signed for newly-promoted Italian Serie A club Pomigliano.

International career
Luik made her debut for the Australian national team in February 2010 in a friendly match against New Zealand. A year later she was part of the squad for the 2010 AFC Women's Asian Cup, which Australia won. In the summer of 2021, she was part of Australia's squad for the delayed 2020 Olympics and made three appearances during the tournament. Shortly after the Olympic Games, in August 2021, she announced her retirement from the national team, having made over 30 appearances. Five months later, Luik returned from retirement and was named in Australia's 2022 AFC Women's Asian Cup squad.

Luik was selected for the Australian women's football Matildas soccer team which qualified for the Tokyo 2020 Olympics. The Matildas advanced to the quarter-finals with one victory and a draw in the group play. In the quarter-finals they beat Great Britain 4-3 after extra time. However, they lost 1–0 to Sweden in the semi-final and were then beaten 4–3 in the bronze medal playoff by USA. Full details.

International goals

Honours
Brisbane Roar
 W-League Champion: 2010–11

Brøndby IF
 Elitedivisionen: 2011–12

Melbourne City
 W-League Premier: 2015–16, 2019–20
 W-League Champion: 2015–16, 2016–17, 2017–18, 2019–20

Vålerenga
 Norwegian Women's Cup: 2017

Australia
 AFC Women's Asian Cup: 2010
 AFC Olympic Qualifying Tournament: 2016

Further reading
 Grainey, Timothy (2012), Beyond Bend It Like Beckham: The Global Phenomenon of Women's Soccer, University of Nebraska Press, 
 Williams, Jean (2007), "A Beautiful Game: International Perspectives on Women's Football", A&C Black,

References

External links

 
 
 Melbourne City FC player profile 
 Perth Glory profile 
 
 
 

1985 births
Living people
Australian women's soccer players
Australian people of Estonian descent
Australian people of Swedish descent
Brisbane Roar FC (A-League Women) players
Brøndby IF (women) players
Perth Glory FC (A-League Women) players
Melbourne City FC (A-League Women) players
A-League Women players
Notts County L.F.C. players
Women's Super League players
Expatriate women's footballers in Denmark
Expatriate women's footballers in Iceland
Expatriate women's footballers in England
Expatriate women's footballers in Spain
Australia women's international soccer players
Women's association football midfielders
Australian expatriate sportspeople in Spain
Australian expatriate sportspeople in England
Nevada Wolf Pack women's soccer players
Vålerenga Fotball Damer players
Australian expatriate sportspeople in Denmark
F.C. Indiana players
Levante UD Femenino players
Primera División (women) players
2019 FIFA Women's World Cup players
Avaldsnes IL players
Footballers at the 2020 Summer Olympics
Olympic soccer players of Australia
Sevilla FC (women) players
Australian expatriate sportspeople in Italy
Expatriate women's footballers in Italy
Serie A (women's football) players
Pomigliano C.F. players
IFK Kalmar players
Damallsvenskan players
Australian expatriate sportspeople in Sweden
Expatriate women's footballers in Sweden
Toppserien players
Australian expatriate sportspeople in Norway
Expatriate women's footballers in Norway
Fylkir women's football players
Australian expatriate sportspeople in Iceland
Australian expatriate women's soccer players
Ottawa Fury (women) players
Expatriate women's soccer players in Canada
USL W-League (1995–2015) players
Australian expatriate sportspeople in Canada
Soccer players from Perth, Western Australia